Forrest Edwin Behm (July 31, 1919 – June 29, 2015) was an American football player. He played college football for the Nebraska Cornhuskers. He was elected to the College Football Hall of Fame in 1988.

References

External links
 

1919 births
2015 deaths
American football tackles
Nebraska Cornhuskers football players
College Football Hall of Fame inductees
Sportspeople from Lincoln, Nebraska
Players of American football from Nebraska